The Tripoli Shrine Temple is a Shriners temple built 1926-28 in the Concordia neighborhood of Milwaukee, Wisconsin. The building's design incorporates Moorish and Indian elements, somewhat resembling the Taj Mahal in India, and is listed on the National Register of Historic Places as Tripoli Temple.  It is not a religious building.

Description 
The Tripoli Shrine was founded in 1885 by nobles from the Medinah Temple in Chicago, a fraternal order that traces its lineage to a Masonic lodge established in 1843 by early settlers of Milwaukee. This lodge later founded a dozen other lodges.

Tripoli Temple was designed by architects Alfred Clas and Shepard in Moorish Revival style. Built at a cost of $616,999.61, it formally opened on May 14, 1928 after over two years of construction. It was the first temple in Wisconsin, and was home to 13,000 Shriners in the area. The building is one of the best of examples of Moorish Revival architecture in the United States, a style that was particularly popular for synagogues and movie theaters. The Temple's design is loosely based on the Taj Mahal, with the addition of Mudéjar style polychrome stone coursing.  An ornately tiled main dome that spans 30 feet in diameter crowns the structure and is flanked by two smaller domes of like design. Sculptures depicting a pair of kneeling camels grace the entrance, while the interior is decorated with ceramic tile of intricate floral designs and plaster lattice work.

External links 
Tripoli Shrine Temple
Tripoli Shrine Circus

See also
Moorish Revival
Kneeling Camels

References 

Buildings and structures in Milwaukee
Moorish Revival architecture in Wisconsin
Shriners
Masonic buildings in Wisconsin
Masonic buildings completed in 1928
Clubhouses on the National Register of Historic Places in Wisconsin
National Register of Historic Places in Milwaukee